San Pedro de Putina Puncu District is one of ten districts of the province Sandia in Peru.

References